Joe Maruzzo is an American actor known for his roles in Unsub, The Sopranos, The Young and the Restless, and others. Also a writer, Maruzzo's work has been featured in editions of The Best American Short Plays.

Filmography

Film

Television

References 

Living people
American male film actors
American male television actors
20th-century American male actors
21st-century American male actors
Year of birth missing (living people)